Home Properties was a real estate management company that owned, operated, acquired, and renovated apartment communities. As of December 31, 2014, the company owned 42,107 apartment units, all of which were in Washington, D.C., Baltimore, Philadelphia, Long Island, Northern New Jersey, Boston, Chicago, and Florida. The company was acquired by Lone Star Funds in 2015 and dissolved.

The company specialized in acquiring older "Class C" and "Class B-" apartment communities and upgrading them to at least "Class B" quality.

History
Home Properties dates back to Home Leasing Corporation, a company founded in 1967 by twin brothers Nelson and Norman Leenhouts.

Home Properties, Inc. was formed in 1993 and, on August 4, 1994, the company became a public company via an initial public offering.

In February 2003, the company acquired a property in Stoughton, Massachusetts for $34 million.

In September 2003, the company acquired a property in Silver, Spring, Maryland for $58.9 million. The company sold the property in April 2013.

Effective January 1, 2004, Edward J. Pettinella was named president and CEO.

In December 2005, the company acquired two contiguous apartment communities, Peppertree Farm and Cinnamon Run, in Silver Spring, Maryland for $172 million.

In March 2007, the company acquired a property in Beverly, Massachusetts for $36.4 million.

In September 2011, the company acquired a property in White Marsh, Maryland for $90.4 million.

In July 2012, the company acquired a property in Ellicott City, Maryland for $186 million.

In December 2013, the company acquired a property in Brookhaven, Pennsylvania for $15.5 million.

In February 2014, the company sold a property in Montgomery Village, Maryland for $110 million.

In February 2015, the company acquired a property in Matawan, New Jersey for $31 million.

In October 2015, Lone Star Funds acquired the company.

References

1993 establishments in New York (state)
Defunct real estate companies of the United States
Real estate companies established in 1993